This is a list of Hofstra Pride football players in the NFL Draft.

Key

Selections

References

Hofstra

Hofstra Pride NFL Draft